Agyrtiola is a genus of moths in the subfamily Arctiinae. It contains the single species Agyrtiola niepelti, which is found in Brazil.

References

Natural History Museum Lepidoptera generic names catalog

Arctiinae
Monotypic moth genera
Moths of South America